Mark Wiseman is a businessman and financier. He is currently the chair of the Alberta Investment Management Corporation. He was formerly a manager at BlackRock. Prior to 2016, Wiseman was President and CEO of the Canada Pension Plan Investment Board (CPPIB).

Education
Born in Niagara Falls, Ontario, Wiseman earned a bachelor's degree from Queen's University as well as a law degree and an MBA from the University of Toronto. He obtained a Master of Laws degree from Yale University.

Career

Early in his career, Wiseman was an officer with Harrowston, a publicly traded Canadian merchant bank and a lawyer with Sullivan & Cromwell, practicing in New York and Paris. He also was a law clerk to Madam Justice Beverley McLachlin at the Supreme Court of Canada. Then, Wiseman was responsible for the private equity fund and co-investment program at the Ontario Teachers’ Pension Plan. Wiseman then joined the Canadian Pension Plan Investment Board (CPPIB) as a Senior VP in 2005. Wiseman became the President and CEO of CPPIB in 2012.

From 2016 to 2019, Wiseman was a Senior Managing Director at BlackRock, Global Head of Active Equities, Chairman of its alternatives business, and Chairman of BlackRock’s Global Investment Committee. He was also on BlackRock’s Global Executive Committee. On December 5, 2019, Wiseman was fired from his position at BlackRock following a failure to report a consensual relationship with a subordinate employee under his reporting line. in violation of the company’s relationship at work policy. Wiseman stated in an internal memo “I engaged in a consensual relationship with one of our colleagues without reporting it. I regret my mistake and I accept responsibility for my actions.”

Wiseman advised various businesses, most recently joining Lazard as a part-time Senior Advisor. He is also a Senior Advisor to Boston Consulting Group and Hillhouse Capital.

He is a co-founder and Chair of the Century Initiative, a lobbying group focused on increasing Canada's population to 100 million by 2100.

Wiseman is the Co-Founder and former Chairman of FCLTGlobal (formerly Focusing Capital on the Long Term), an organization that encourages longer-term approaches in business and investing, which was set up by BlackRock, CPPIB, Dow, McKinsey & Company and Tata in 2016.

In June 2020, Wiseman was named the new chair of the Alberta Investment Management Corporation.

Personal life
Wiseman had a common-law relationship with a woman he met in 1992 on his first day at University of Toronto (Marcia Moffat, currently Country Head of Canada for BlackRock, who joined the firm a year before Wiseman).   Their relationship ended after he was fired from BlackRock in 2019 for having an undisclosed relationship with a subordinate.

References

1970 births
Living people
Canadian financiers
Canadian chief executives
CPP Investment Board people
Jewish Canadian activists
Jewish Canadian philanthropists